The 2001 ASB Classic was a women's tennis tournament played on outdoor hard courts at the ASB Tennis Centre in Auckland, New Zealand and was part of Tier V of the 2001 WTA Tour. It was the 16th edition of the tournament and was held from 1 January until 6 January 2001. Unseeded Meilen Tu won the singles title and earned $16,000 first-prize money.

Finals

Singles

 Meilen Tu defeated  Paola Suárez 7–6(12–10), 6–2
 It was Tu's only title of the year and the 1st of her career.

Doubles

 Alexandra Fusai /  Rita Grande defeated  Emmanuelle Gagliardi /  Barbara Schett 7–6(7–4), 6–3
 It was Fusai's only title of the year and the 12th of her career. It was Grande's 1st title of the year and the 4th of her career.

WTA entrants

Seeds

 Rankings are as of December 25, 2000.

Other entrants
The following players received wildcards into the singles main draw:
  Leanne Baker
  María Emilia Salerni

The following players received entry from the qualifying draw:
  Lenka Dlhopolcova
  Jill Craybas
  Alexandra Fusai
  Allison Bradshaw

See also
 2001 Heineken Open – men's tournament

External links
 Official website
 ITF tournament edition details
 Tournament draws

ASB Classic
WTA Auckland Open
ASB
ASB
2001 in New Zealand tennis